Phytophthora × cambivora is a plant pathogen that causes ink disease in European chestnut trees (Castanea sativa). Ink disease, also caused by Phytophthora cinnamomi, is thought to have been present in Europe since the 18th century, and causes chestnut trees to wilt and die; major epidemics occurred during the 19th and 20th centuries. P. cinnamomi and P. × cambivora are now present throughout Europe since the 1990s.  Ink disease has resurged, often causing high mortality of trees, particularly in Portugal, Italy, and France. It has also been isolated from a number of different species since the 1990s, including:

Golden chinquapin trees, (Chrysolepis chrysophylla) in Oregon, United States Rhododendron and Pieris species in North Carolina
Noble fir trees (Abies procera) in Norway
Beech trees (Fagus sylvatica) in Italy and Germany.

Some species of mycorrhiza (including Amanita muscaria, Suillellus luridus, and Hebeloma radicosum) may provide protection from P. cambivora in European chestnuts.Phytophthora × cambivora'' is a hybrid.

See also
 Forest pathology
 Wilt disease

References

External links
Index Fungorum
USDA ARS Fungal Database

cambivora
Water mould plant pathogens and diseases
Nut tree diseases